The gymnastics competitions at the 2019 Southeast Asian Games in the Philippines was held at the Rizal Memorial Coliseum from 1 to 9 December 2019.

Schedule
The following is the schedule for the gymnastics competitions. All times are Philippine Standard Time (UTC+8).

Artistic

 Rhythmic

 Aerobic

Medal summary

Medalists

Aerobic

Artistic

Men

Women

Rhythmic

References

External links